William T. Lawrence (born 1947) is an inactive Senior United States district judge of the United States District Court for the Southern District of Indiana.

Education and career

Born in Indianapolis, Indiana, Lawrence received a Bachelor of Science degree from Indiana University in 1970 and a Juris Doctor from the Indiana University Robert H. McKinney School of Law in 1973. He was in private practice in Indianapolis from 1973 to 1997. He was a Public defender, Marion County Superior Court, Indiana from 1974 to 1983. He was the Master Commissioner, Marion County Circuit Court, Indiana, from 1983 to 1997. He was a Presiding judge, Marion County Circuit Court, Indiana from 1997 to 2002. He was a United States magistrate judge of the  United States District Court for the Southern District of Indiana, from 2002 to 2008.

Federal judicial service

Lawrence is a United States District Judge of the United States District Court for the Southern District of Indiana. Lawrence was nominated by President George W. Bush on February 14, 2008, to a seat vacated by John Daniel Tinder. He was confirmed by the United States Senate on June 26, 2008, and received his commission on June 30, 2008. He assumed senior status on July 1, 2018.

Sources

1947 births
Living people
Indiana University Robert H. McKinney School of Law alumni
Judges of the United States District Court for the Southern District of Indiana
United States district court judges appointed by George W. Bush
21st-century American judges
Public defenders
United States magistrate judges
People from Indianapolis